The Collège Sismondi, is one of 11 public secondary schools in Geneva offering a 'Certificat de maturité gymnasiale', which provides access to all Swiss universities.

The school is located right next to the United Nations Office in Geneva and across the Maison de la paix.

Admission & dropout rate

Admission to the Collège is selective, only students with good grades in German & Mathematics at the end of the 9th year of obligatory schooling (around 15 years old) can be admitted. Only a maximum of 25% of students in this age group enter the Collèges in Geneva. Approximately 60% of those admitted will not successfully finish their studies, and a large amount will do it in 5 or 6 years.

Postobligatory Secondary Education Schools in Geneva have an average dropout rate of: 50% in the first year, 15% in the second year, 35% in the third year and 20% in the fourth year.

System
Students who want to pursue an education past the (obligatory) Cycle d'Orientation enter the four-year college from 15-19.

The successful completion of the four-year studies, offers direct access to universities & the Swiss Federal Institute of Technology.

Curriculum
College Sismondi is one of four high schools in Geneva, offering a Bilingual Maturity (either French-English or French-German)

The Formation Gymnasiale consists of:
 11 Fundamental subjects : French, second national language (German or Italian), third national language or English or Latin, mathematics (2 levels), physics (2 levels), chemistry, biology, history, geography, philosophy, visual arts or music.
 1 Specific option : Latin, Greek, third national language  - German ou Italian - English, Spanish, physics & mathematical applications, biology and chemistry, economics & Law, visual arts or music.
 1 Complementary option in 3rd year: Mathematical applications, computer science, physics, chemistry, history, geography, philosophy, economics & law, visual arts, music, sports.
 1 Particular subject : Physical education.
 1 Maturity research project in third and fourth year: Personal research project done over the last two years.

References and footnotes

External links
Official Collège Sismondi Website. 
Geneva Postobligatory Secondary Education. 
Rapport de la Commission de l’enseignement. 

Schools in Geneva